Hadley House and Grist Mill is a historic home and grist mill located near Pittsboro, Chatham County, North Carolina.  The house was built about 1858, and is a two-story, three bay by two bay, Greek Revival style frame dwelling. It has a one-story rear ell and one-bay front porch, and sits on a stone foundation.  The mill dates to 1885, and is a three-story frame structure on a stone foundation.  It has an exterior iron mill wheel measuring 16 feet in diameter.  The mill continued in operation until the 1930s. Also on the property are the contributing two-story frame smokehouse, foundation stones for the original detached kitchen and quarters, and archaeological remains.

It was listed on the National Register of Historic Places in 1980.

References

Grinding mills in North Carolina
Houses on the National Register of Historic Places in North Carolina
Grinding mills on the National Register of Historic Places in North Carolina
Greek Revival houses in North Carolina
Houses completed in 1858
Houses in Chatham County, North Carolina
National Register of Historic Places in Chatham County, North Carolina
Pittsboro, North Carolina